Primbee is a small suburb of Wollongong, New South Wales, Australia. It is located on the northern spit separating Lake Illawarra and the Pacific Ocean. Primbee is close to Windang and Warrawong in the Illawarra.

History
The source of the name Primbee is uncertain. Farms in the area were owned in the 1860s by James Stewart, David James and Thomas Griffin. An 1893 map for the Parish of Wollongong shows the bay off Purry Burry Point as Primbee Bay. The area was subdivided and the land was offered for sale in 1919, not as Primbee but as "The Lake Suburb".

One resident of the area in the 1920s recalled that "I came to Primbee in 1920... My parents were one of the first to buy property, when the estate was cut up. It was called Lake Suburb Estate at the time. I don't known how it came to be called Primbee. No one here was asked or told. It just came."

The local public school (Primbee Public School) was established in 1938. The principal as of 2013 is Dorothy Cass. It had an enrolment of 80 students covering Kindergarten to Year 6 at the beginning of 2011.

References

Suburbs of Wollongong